My Family Tree is a Disney Channel short that first aired in November 2010, which is still airing on Disney Channel.

Premise
Short shares about a boy/girl traveling to another state or country to see their family. Before they go they share how he/she is related. They usually show their family on video saying "Hi".

See also
 Disney's Friends for Change
 List of programs broadcast by Disney Channel

Disney Channel original programming
2010 American television series debuts